Mike Rietpietsch (born 26 March 1974) is a German former professional footballer who played as a midfielder.

Honours
 Bundesliga runner-up: 1996–97

References

1974 births
Living people
People from Eberswalde
German footballers
Footballers from Brandenburg
Association football midfielders
Germany under-21 international footballers
1. FC Frankfurt players
1. FC Union Berlin players
Bayer 04 Leverkusen players
Fortuna Düsseldorf players
SC Freiburg players
VfL Bochum players
Rot-Weiß Oberhausen players
MSV Duisburg players
Holstein Kiel players
Wuppertaler SV players
Bundesliga players
2. Bundesliga players
3. Liga players